Olympique Antibes, in full Olympique d'Antibes Juan-les-Pins and branded as Antibes Sharks, is a basketball club from the city of Antibes, France. Established in 1933, the club's men's senior team currently plays in LNB Pro B, the French second division.

The club has won the French championship three times, the last being in 1995.

History
The basketball team rose to prominence in the years 1950–60. In 1970, the team won the championship of France thanks to players of exception like Jean-Claude Bonato, Dan Rodriguez and Jacques Cachemire.

At the beginning of the Eighties, Antibes suffered several disappointing seasons, but improved throughout the decade, and eventually won the LNB Pro A title in 1991. At the beginning of the Nineties, Antibes regularly contended for titles alongside Limoges CSP and Pau-Orthez.

In 1995, the club won a third national title before being plagued by financial problems. In 2002, in spite of finishing in a position that would have kept them safe from relegation, the club was dropped to LNB Pro B for lack of financial guarantees. Antibes then went through difficult years in Pro B. Then, in 2006–07, the club were relegated from Pro B to the nominally amateur Nationale 1. Although their 16th-place finish that season would normally have kept them safe from relegation, that season saw three teams relegated instead of the normal two because of a decision to reduce the number of teams in the top Pro A league. They would return to the professional ranks at the first opportunity, winning the Pro B crown in 2008.

For the 2013 season, Antibes has new ambitions in a Pro B league where the other favourites are clubs like Pau-Orthez, Hyères Toulon, two teams coming from Pro A, and JL Bourg Basket. They end up in fifth place at the end of the regular season and win the play-offs against Champagne Châlons Reims, synonym with a spot in the Pro A championship from next season. Yet in the following year, they finish bottom of the league with 6 wins and 24 defeats, and returned once more to the Pro B.

During the 2014–2015 season, they finish 6th of the regular season, and win also the B Leaders Cup, a victory that, as a matter of fact, guaranteed them a playoff spot. They win the playoffs against Denain after having defeated Nantes and Le portel on their way to the final. Just one year after leaving the Pro A championship they earned the right to go back to the elite tier.

Arenas
From 1951 to 1991, Olympique Antibes played their home games at the Salusse-Santoni Hall, which has a seating capacity of 1,300 people. From 1991 to 2009, Olympique Antibes played their homes games at the 5,051 seat Jean Bunoz Sports Hall. Since 2013, the club hosts their home games at the Azur Arena Antibes. The arena is located in Antibes, France, and it was opened in 2013. It has a seating capacity of 5,249 people for basketball games.

Honours

 French League
 Winners (3):1969–70, 1990–91, 1994–95
 French League 2 
 Winners (1): 2012–13
 French League 3 
 Winners (1): 2007–08
 LNB Pro B Leaders Cup
 Winners (1): 2015

Season by season

Top performances in European & Worldwide competitions

Players

Retired numbers

Current roster 

<noinclude>

Notable players

Head coaches
 Hervé Dubuisson

References

External links
Official Site
Official board

1933 establishments in France
Basketball teams established in 1933
Antibes
Olympique